Henry Kemble Oliver (November 24, 1800 – August 12, 1885) was an American who served as the 5th Mayor of Lawrence, Massachusetts, the 21st Mayor of Salem, Massachusetts as a member of the Massachusetts House of Representatives, the Adjutant General of Massachusetts, and as the 26th Treasurer of Massachusetts.

Early life
Oliver was born to Daniel and Elizabeth (Kemble) Oliver on November 24, 1800 in  North  Beverly, Massachusetts.  Originally named Thomas Henry, Oliver's name was changed, by the legislature, in 1821 to that of his mother's brother who had died in 1802.

Oliver entered Phillips Academy, Andover in 1811 and Harvard College in the fall of 1814, however because Harvard was becoming overly Unitarian in its views and also more expensive, Oliver left Harvard after his sophomore year and transferred to Dartmouth College entering Dartmouth's Junior class in the fall of 1816.  Oliver graduated from Dartmouth College. Oliver also received a degree Ad eundem from Harvard. At the age of 25, in 1825, Oliver joined the Unitarian church. The same year, he married Sally Cook, and they had seven children.

In 1844 Oliver was appointed the Adjutant General of Massachusetts by Governor George N. Briggs.

He died at his home in Salem on August 12, 1885.

References

External links
 

  
  
  

1800 births
1885 deaths
State treasurers of Massachusetts
Mayors of Lawrence, Massachusetts
Mayors of Salem, Massachusetts
Harvard College alumni
Dartmouth College alumni
Republican Party members of the Massachusetts House of Representatives
19th-century American politicians
Adjutants General of Massachusetts